The Wooden Carpet or Farseh Chob is a 2008 Iran documentary film by Iranian Kurd director Abdolrahman Mirani, and co-produced by Honasra Qanun Institute.

Synopsis
We are in a village in the Kermanshah region, on the border between Iran and Iraq. This territory, at the foot of Mounts Zagros at about 1,400 metres altitude, is very poor and isolated. A flood has destroyed the only bridge so communications with the village are cut. This event mobilised the whole community, which started to work tirelessly in order to reconstruct the bridge. The documentary film narrates, step by step, every small effort made by all the inhabitants of the village, whether they are men, women, elderly people or children. The final result is, in its naturalness and spontaneity, really amazing: a long bridge made from trunks and branches finely intertwined, as if it were a decorated carpet suspended between the two banks.

Awards
 Won – François Ode Award (International Short Film Festival in Hamburg), 2009
 Won – Bansko Town prize (Bansko Mountain Film Festival Awards), 2008
 Won - Paras International Documentary Short (Leeds International Film Festival), 2009
 International Film Festival in Ankara in 2008
 International Film Festival in Leeds (England), 2009
 International Short Film Festival in Tehran in 2009
 International Mountain Film Festival in Trento, 2009
 International Film Festival in Uppsala (Sweden), 2009
 Festival “Black International Cinema” in Berlin in 2009

References

External links

2008 films
2008 documentary films
Iranian documentary films
Kurdish films
Kurdish-language films